is a prefecture of Japan located in the Chūgoku region of Honshu. Tottori Prefecture borders Shimane Prefecture to the west, Hiroshima Prefecture to the southwest, Okayama Prefecture to the south, and Hyōgo Prefecture to the east.

Tottori is the capital and largest city of Tottori Prefecture, with other major cities including Yonago, Kurayoshi, and Sakaiminato. Tottori Prefecture is home to the Tottori Sand Dunes, the largest sand dunes system in Japan, and Mount Daisen, the highest peak in the Chūgoku Mountains.

Etymology
The word "Tottori" in Japanese is formed from two kanji characters. The first, means "bird" and the second,  means "to get". Early residents in the area made their living catching the region's plentiful waterfowl. The name first appears in the Nihon shoki in the 23rd year of the Emperor Suinin (213 AD) when Yukuha Tana, an elder from the Izumo, visits the emperor. The imperial Prince Homatsu-wake was unable to speak, despite being 30 years of age.
"Yukuha Tana presented the swan to the emperor. Homatsu-wake no Mikoto played with this swan and at last learned to speak. Therefore, Yukaha Tana was liberally rewarded, and was granted the title of Tottori no Miyakko." (Aston, translation)

History

Early history
Tottori Prefecture was settled very early in the prehistoric period of Japan, as evidenced by remains from the Jōmon period (14,000 – 300 BC). The prefecture has the remains of the largest known Yayoi period (300 BC – 250 AD) settlement in Japan, the Mukibanda Yayoi remains, located in the low foothills of Mount Daisen in the cities of Daisen and Yonago. Numerous kofun tumuli from the Kofun period (250 – 538) are located across the prefecture. In 645, under the Taika reforms, the area in present-day Tottori Prefecture became two provinces, Hōki and Inaba.

Later history
During the Genpei War (1180–1185) between the Taira and Minamoto clans in the late-Heian period, Tottori became a base for anti-Taira forces, specifically at two temples, Daisen-ji and Sanbutsu-ji. By the beginning of the Kamakura period (1185–1333) shōen estates were established to directly support the Imperial court and various temples. Successive clans controlled the region during the Sengoku period (15th to 17th century), most notably the Yamana clan, but after the Battle of Sekigahara in 1600 the region was pacified. The Tokugawa shogunate installed the Ikeda clan at Tottori Castle. The clan retained control of the area until throughout the Edo period (1603–1868) and the resources of the area financially and materially supported the shogunate.

Modern history
The two provinces remained in place until the Meiji Restoration in 1868, and the boundaries of Tottori Prefecture were established in 1888. After the occupation of Korea and Taiwan in the 20th century, and the establishment of the Manchukuo puppet state in 1932, Tottori's harbors on the Japan Sea served as an active transit point for goods between Japan and the colonial areas. Before the end of World War II the prefecture was hit by a massive magnitude 7.2 earthquake, the 1943 Tottori earthquake, which destroyed 80% of the city of Tottori, and greatly damaged the surrounding area. In the postwar period land reform was carried out in the prefecture, resulting in a great increase of agricultural production.

Geography

Tottori is home to the Tottori Sand Dunes, Japan's only large dune system. As of 1 April 2012, 14% of the total land area of the prefecture was designated as Natural Parks, namely the Daisen-Oki and Sanin Kaigan National Parks; Hiba-Dōgo-Taishaku and Hyōnosen-Ushiroyama-Nagisan Quasi-National Parks; and Misasa-Tōgōko, Nishi Inaba, and Okuhino Prefectural Natural Parks.

Mount Misumi is located within the former area of Mochigase that was merged into the city of Tottori in 2004.

Cities
Four cities are located in Tottori Prefecture:

Towns and villages
These are the towns and villages in each district:

Mergers

Demographics

Per Japanese census data, Tottori is the least populated prefecture in Japan.

Economy
Tottori Prefecture is heavily agricultural and its products are shipped to the major cities of Japan. Some of the famous products are the nashi pear, nagaimo yam, Japanese scallion, negi, and watermelon. The prefecture is also a major producer of rice.

Language
Historically, the region had extensive linguistic diversity. While the standard Tokyo dialect of the Japanese language is now used in Tottori Prefecture, several other dialects are also used. Many of them are grouped with Western Japanese, and include the Chugoku and Umpaku dialects.

Sports

The sports teams listed below are based in Tottori.

Football (soccer)
Gainare Tottori  (Yonago)

Education

Universities
Tottori University
Tottori University of Environmental Studies

Colleges
Tottori College

Noted places

Tottori City

 Tottori Sand Dunes
 Jinpūkaku, a late Meiji period residence

Daisen

 Daisen, the highest of the Chūgoku Mountains,

Daisen and Yonago
 Mukibanda Yayoi remains, the largest site of Yayoi period settlement in Japan

Yonago and Sakaiminato
 
 Nakaumi, a brackish lake located between Tottori Prefecture and Shimane Prefecture, fifth largest lake in Japan

Misasa
 Misasa Onsen
 Sanbutsu-ji, a Heian period temple designated a National Treasure of Japan

Sakaiminato
 Kitarō Road, a street in Sakaiminato dedicated to Shigeru Mizuki's GeGeGe no Kitaro manga character
 Lake Koyama

Iwami
 Uradome Coast, a scenic ria coastal inlet

Chizu
 The Ishitani Residence, an Edo period family residence designated a National Treasure of Japan

Nanbu
 Tottori Hanakairo-Flower Park, the largest flower park in Japan

Transportation

Rail
JR West
Sanin Line
Hakubi Line
Imbi Line
Sakai Line
Wakasa Railway
Chizu Express

Roads

Expressway and toll roads
　Tottori Expressway
　Yonago Expressway
　Sanin Expressway
　Shidosaka Pass Road
　Tottori-Toyooka-Miyazu Road

National highways
Route 9
Route 29 (Tottori-Shiso-Himeji)
Route 53 (Tottori-Tsuyama-Okayama)
Route 178
Route 179
Route 180
Route 181 (Yonago-Niimi-Okayama)
Route 183
Route 313
Route 373
Route 431
Route 482

Ports
Sakaiminato Port - ferry route to Oki Island, and international container hub

Airports
Tottori Airport
Yonago Airport

Prefectural symbols
The symbol is derived from the first mora in Japanese for "と" combined with the picture of a flying bird, and symbolizes peace, liberty, and the advancement of the Tottori prefecture. It was enacted in 1968 to celebrate the 100th year from the first year of the Meiji Era.

Notes

References
 Nussbaum, Louis-Frédéric and Käthe Roth. (2005).  Japan encyclopedia. Cambridge: Harvard University Press. ;  OCLC 58053128

External links

 

 
Chūgoku region
Prefectures of Japan